God's Army may refer to:
God's Army (film), a motion picture involving missionaries of The Church of Jesus Christ of Latter-day Saints
God's Army (revolutionary group), an armed Christian terrorist group in rebellion against the Theravada Buddhist, military government of Myanmar
The Prophecy, a horror film known in Europe as God's Army
The biblical heavenly host
God's Army, an album reissue

See also 
 Army of God (disambiguation)